Keep On Rockin' is the second greatest hits album by Australian singer-songwriter Brian Cadd. It was released in Australia in 1976 by J&B records. The album peaked at number 54 in the Australian Kent Music Report album charts in 1984.

Track listing
Vinyl/Cassette (JB 180)

Side A
 "Keep On Rockin'"	
 "Ginger Man"	
 "Every Mother's Son"	
 "Let Go"	
 "Show Me The Way"	
 "Silver City Birthday Celebration Day"	
 "Class Of '74"	
 "Moonshine"

Side B	
 "Alvin Purple"	
 "Gimme Gimme Good Lovin'"	
 "Boogie Queen"	
 "Heroes"	
 "Sweet Rock 'N' Roll"	
 "Spring Hill County Breakdown"
 "Riverboat Lady"	
 "Fairweather Friend"

Charts

References

Brian Cadd albums
Compilation albums by Australian artists
1976 greatest hits albums